Norwich Over the Water is the name given to a district located in the north of the city centre of the English city of Norwich. The modern term Silver Triangle refers to the expanse of Victorian terraced housing beyond the walls in the direction of the Norwich suburb of Sprowston.

Description
, loosely translated to Norwich over the Water,  is the name of a historic ward in the English city of Norwich, located between the city's northern medieval walls and the River Wensum. Few of the medieval buildings from this part of the city have survived; the area's oldest surviving buildings are to be found around Colegate, and along Magdalen St and St Augustine's, many dating back to the Tudor and Georgian periods. The area also has many Victorian terraces and town houses for example in Calvert street, Esdelle Street and Magpie Road. 

The term Norwich Over the Water was coined in the 1970s, when an area on either side of the remains of the city's northern medieval walls was regenerated as part of an initiative for the European Architectural Heritage Year.

History

The historic ward up to 1835

Archaeological evidence from excavation work done at Fishergate suggests that although there was urban activity along the north side of the Wensum during the middle Anglo-Saxon period, people did not live there. The city north of the river was settled before the middle of the 10th century, when coins were being minted. excavations and evidence provided by the existence of Scandinavian place-names have shown that from the 10th century the area had a large and permanent Danish presence. Some of the area's earliest churches, such as the pre-Conquest St Clement, located in a typically Scandinavian way on a main road close to a river crossing, were dedicated to popular Danish saints. During this period the settlement was defended by a bank and ditch north of the river. According to the Anglo-Saxon Chronicle, the Viking ruler Sweyn Forkbeard attacked and destroyed Norwich in 1004. Some of the rebuilt churches, for instance St Margaret Combust ,and St Mary Unbrent, had names which referred to this attack.

When the town was rebuilt, the area south of the river was first developed. After the city walls were built in 1290 CE, the area north of the river gradually became known as Norwich Over the Water. During the Tudor period, the name "Norwich Over the Water" was used in records used for the calculation of taxes and other official documents.

As the textile industry expanded in Norwich during the medieval and Tudor periods, industry, labour and wealth were all transferred to the Ultra Aquam ward.

During the medieval period, Stump Cross, now under Magdalen Street, was once considered to be the centre of Norwich Over-the-Water. The site of a stone monument, it was one of the locations in the city where the accession of the new monarch was announced. The cross was mentioned in sources from 1500 and 1538. It was demolished during the 16th century, rebuilt in 1640, but then removed in 1644. Matthew Parker, the  Archbishop of Canterbury from 1559 until his death in 1575, was born, and lived in the parish of St Saviour, before moving to London.

In 1611, during a fireworks display held by Thomas Anguish, following his election as mayor, he held a pageant and fireworks display outside his house, over 30 people were crushed to death running from his house when the fireworks exploded accidentally. Anguish made provisions in his will to help the city's poor children; the Children's Hospital in Fishergate opened in 1621, initially for boys only. The building was demolished in the 1930s.

Over the Water was one of four 'Great Wards' that existed inside the city boundary from 1404 to 1835, the other wards being Conisford, Mancroft, and Wymer. The wards replaced the court leets that had existed since the 13th century.

Post1835 
The ward continued to be known as Norwich Over the Water until 1835, when the City of Norwich and the surrounding areas were reorganised by an act of Parliament. After that, with outlying areas becoming part of the city, Norwich Over the Water gradually became part of the city centre. In 1832, electoral reforms finally ended over 500 years of the name's official usage.

The area is characterised by its mixture of historic architecture, shops, terrace housing, and light industrial units. Many buildings were demolished and cleared to make way for the inner ring road, and the Anglia Square shopping centre.

Notable residents included Luke Hansard, who printed the Journals of the House of Commons from 1774 until his death, the writer Amelia Opie, who was born at Snailgate (later renamed Calvert Street) in 1769, and the 19th century composer and organist William Crotch.
Elizabeth Fry (née Gurney), the campaigner for prison reform, who was born in 1780; and the 19th century writer and social reformer Harriet Martineau (born 1802) were both born in Gurney Court, off Magdalen Street.

Magdalen Street has been the area's main street used for shopping for hundreds of years. It served as a route through the Anglo-Saxon burgh or defended area, and as the principal road from the southern part of Norwich to the North.  There have been bridges across the river for over 1000 years. In 1959, the Civic Trust helped to improve the area's building frontages, unkempt areas, and cluttered traffic signs as part of an experiment in civic design.  On 8 May 1959, Rt. Hon. Duncan Sandys, M. P., President of the Civic Trust, led five hundred delegates from all over the country on an inspection tour.  It was the first of its kind and would become famous throughout the world.  After this experiment, similar pilot schemes were launched in Burslem, Windsor, and Haddington.

Architecture

The historic ward contains some of Norwich's surviving medieval churches, including St Augustine's, St Clement's, St Edmund's, St James's, St Martin at Oak, St Mary at Coslany, St Michael Coslany, and St Saviour's Church. St George's Church, Colegate is the only medieval church in Norwich Over the Water still used regularly for worship.

As parishes became amalgamated over the centuries, several churches in the area were made redundant and were later demolished; one building, St Paul's Church, was destroyed by bombing during World War II. St Margaret Newbrigge, which stood near St Georges Street, was abandoned after 1368. The other lost churches, all demolished during the 1530s or 1540s, are St Margaret Combust (also referred to as Sancta Margareta uni sepulientur suspensi as the churchyard was a burial ground for criminals); St Olave (located on the edge of Pitt Street); All Saint's Fybriggate (on the corner of Cowgate and Magdalen Streets); St Mary Unbrent (which stood off Magdalen Street); St Botolph's (at the junction of Magdalen Street and Botolph Street); and St John Colegate (the church was located on a site now occupied by the Octagon Chapel, and had an anchorite cell).

The area once had over 40 pubs. Over the years many have closed or been demolished, and  fewer than half of this number are still open.

Groups
During the 1970s, a group led by Jack Burton was formed to advocate for the improvement of the city centre north of the Wensum. Norwich Over the Water was revived as a name for the group.

In 2002, a second Norwich Over the Water group was formed by Paul Scruton and David Bethell. 
Scruton was a Norwich over the Water Party candidate in the local council elections of that year.  The group produced leaflets and promotional items that advertised the area's business and history, and lobbied Norwich City Council about redevelopment plans designed for the area.

In February 2022, plans by the local group Norwich over the Wensum (NOW) to create a Neighbourhood Forum for the area were reported in the local press. If approved, the forum would be able to start the process of developing a plan to "set out a vision for the area and shape developments in their community".

Notes

References

Sources

Further reading
 
 
 
 
 

Areas of Norwich
Norwich

External links
 Norwich Over the Wensum website